The Lichte Trough is an undersea trough named for Heinrich Lichte (1910–1988), a geodesist who specialized in glaciology. The name was proposed by Heinrich Hinze of the Alfred Wegener Institute for Polar and Marine Research, Bremerhaven, Germany, and was approved by the Advisory Committee for Undersea Features in June 1997.

References

Oceanic basins of the Southern Ocean